Clay Jovon Tucker (June 14, 1980) is a retired American professional player.

College career
Tucker played college basketball at the University of Wisconsin-Milwaukee from 1998 to 2003 where he and Dylan Page helped the Panthers to their first NCAA Tournament appearance in 2003.

Professional career
Tucker has bounced around for much of his professional career, playing for several different teams in both the United States and Europe. His most successful season was 2004–05, as a member of the Utah Snowbears in the American Basketball Association. He was Utah's top scorer, averaging over 20 points per game. He teamed with Harold Arceneaux to lead the Snowbears to a 27–1 record that season, best in the league. However, the franchise ceased operations just days before the championship round. Despite playing only one season in the league, he was named to the ABA's All-Decade First Team for 2000–2009.

Tucker played in the NBA Summer League for the Cleveland Cavaliers in 2008 and the Detroit Pistons in 2009. He moved to Europe later in 2009, signing with Cajasol first, later moving to DKV Joventut, before finally joining Real Madrid in 2010. In August 2011 he signed with Lottomatica Roma. In February 2013, he signed a contract with Hacettepe Üniversitesi. In August 2013, he signed with TED Ankara Kolejliler. On March 7, 2016, he has parted ways with his club Torku Konyaspor.

On October 18, 2016, he signed with Byblos Club.

References

External links
 Euroleague.net Profile
 TBLStat.net Profile
 Eurobasket.com Profile
 NBA G League Profile

1980 births
Living people
American expatriate basketball people in Argentina
American expatriate basketball people in France
American expatriate basketball people in Greece
American expatriate basketball people in Italy
American expatriate basketball people in Lebanon
American expatriate basketball people in Russia
American expatriate basketball people in Spain
American expatriate basketball people in Sweden
American expatriate basketball people in Turkey
American expatriate basketball people in Ukraine
American men's basketball players
Arkansas RimRockers players
Basketball players from Ohio
BC Khimki players
BC Kyiv players
Estudiantes Concordia basketball players
Joventut Badalona players
Le Mans Sarthe Basket players
Lega Basket Serie A players
Liga ACB players
Hacettepe Üniversitesi B.K. players
MENT B.C. players
Milwaukee Panthers men's basketball players
Pallacanestro Virtus Roma players
Real Betis Baloncesto players
Point guards
Real Madrid Baloncesto players
Shooting guards
Small forwards
Sportspeople from Lima, Ohio
Sundsvall Dragons players
TED Ankara Kolejliler players
Teramo Basket players